Ray MacDonald (born May 21, 1977) is a Thai actor, adventurer, television presenter and host. He won Best Actor awards at the Thailand National Film Association Awards in 1997 and 1998 for his roles in Fun Bar Karaoke, the debut feature by Pen-Ek Ratanaruang, and O-Negative, which co-starred Tata Young. MacDonald has also been featured in Fake and the Pang Brothers' The Eye 10.

He portrayed Dark Ultraman in the PROJECT ULTRAMAN television series.

In 2007, he co-starred in the supernatural thriller, Opapatika.

Filmography

MC
 Television 
 2013 : สุดเขตเทศกาล On Air Channel 9
 2013 : 48 ชั่วโมง On Air Channel 5
 2014 : 72 ขั่วโมง On Air Channel 5
 2015 : ครัวคริตจานด่วน On Air Channel 3 (2015-)
 2015 : TT RIDER On Air One 31
 2016 : TT RIDER 2 On Air One 31
 2017 : ติดเกาะ On Air true inside
 2017 : SoFa[R] So Good (produce a show) On Air true inside
 2018 : ติดเขา (produce a show) On Air true inside

 Online 
 2018 : FOOD TRIBE ไป-ล่า-กิน On Air Line tv (2018)
 2019 : ROAMING" EP.1 หัวลำโพง กรุงเทพฯ - เวียงจันทน์ On Air YouTube:Rayron : เร่ร่อน (12/9/2019-)
 2021 : อีสานคลาสสิคทริป EP.1 On Air YouTube:Rayron : เร่ร่อน (4/10/2021-)

References

External links

Living people
1977 births
Ray MacDonald
Ray MacDonald
Ray MacDonald
Ray MacDonald
Ray MacDonald
Ray MacDonald
Ray MacDonald
Ray MacDonald
Ray MacDonald
Ray MacDonald
Ray MacDonald
Ray MacDonald
Association footballers not categorized by position